"Scum of the Earth" is a song by heavy metal musician Rob Zombie. It was originally featured on the Mission: Impossible 2 soundtrack and later included on Zombie's album, The Sinister Urge as the lead single. It found considerable radio play upon release.

The song features an intense chorus featuring heavy guitars and a repetitive "hey!" chant. The final chorus culminates with female background vocals.

Rob Zombie guitarist Riggs formed a band in 2003, sharing the name with this song.

Personnel
 Tom Baker - Mastering
 Scott Humphrey - Producer, Programming, Mixing
 Blasko - Bass
 Riggs - Guitar
 Tempesta - Drums
 Rob Zombie - Vocals, Lyricist, Producer, Art Direction

References

Rob Zombie songs
2000 singles
Mission: Impossible music
Songs written by Scott Humphrey
Songs written by Rob Zombie
2000 songs
Geffen Records singles
Mission: Impossible (film series)